Chasmanthe is a genus of flowering plants in the family Iridaceae, first described in 1932. It is endemic to Cape Province in South Africa. It is widely grown as an ornamental and naturalized in various locations.

In their native habitat the flowers are pollinated by sunbirds. The genus name is derived from the Greek words chasme, meaning "gaping", and anthos, meaning "flower".

 Species
 Chasmanthe aethiopica  (L.) N.E.Br. (Chasmanthe, Cobra Lily) - Cape Province; naturalized in the Canary Islands, Madeira, continental Portugal, continental Spain, Balearics and the Greek islands.
 Chasmanthe bicolor  (Gasp. ex Ten.) N.E.Br. - Cape Province; naturalized in California, Italy and Great Britain
 Chasmanthe floribunda  (Salisb.) N.E.Br. (South African Cornflag, Pennants) - Cape Province; naturalized in California, Algeria, Australia, Argentina, St. Helena

References

 Royal Botanic Gardens, Kew: World Checklist Series
 PlantZAfrica.com - Chasmanthe aethiopica
 Iziko Museums of Cape Town - Chasmanthe

Iridaceae genera
Endemic flora of South Africa
Garden plants
Iridaceae
Taxa named by N. E. Brown